Don't Mow Your Lawn is an album by trombonist Ray Anderson and his Alligatory band which was released on the Enja label in 1994.

Reception

The Allmusic review by Scott Yanow stated "Trombonist Ray Anderson is typically uninhibited throughout this joke-filled set. His high-note screams are well-matched by trumpeter Lew Soloff and some of the vocals (most notably on the title cut) are memorable. There is some strong playing by the two horns ... the humor and philosophizing are often dominant".

Track listing
All compositions by Ray Anderson except where noted
 "Don't Mow Your Lawn" (Ray Anderson, Jackie Raven) – 5:39
 "Diddleybop" – 8:44
 "Damaged But Good" (Anderson, Raven) – 5:31	
 "Alligatory Pecadillo" – 7:41	
 "What'cha Gonna Do With That" (Anderson, Raven) – 5:28	
 "Airwaves" – 10:30
 "Blow Your Own Horn" (Anderson, Raven) – 9:45	
 "Disguise the Limit" – 6:53

Personnel
Ray Anderson – trombone, lead vocal
Lew Soloff – trumpet
Jerome Harris – guitar, background vocal
Gregory Jones – bass, background vocal
Tommy Campbell – drums
Frank Colón – percussion

References

Ray Anderson (musician) albums
1994 albums
Enja Records albums